Crows Nest was an electoral district of the Legislative Assembly in the Australian state of Queensland from 1992 to 2001.

The district took in rural areas in southern Queensland, centred on the town of Crows Nest.

Members for Crows Nest

Election results

See also
 Electoral districts of Queensland
 Members of the Queensland Legislative Assembly by year
 :Category:Members of the Queensland Legislative Assembly by name

References

Former electoral districts of Queensland
Constituencies established in 1992
Constituencies disestablished in 2001
1992 establishments in Australia
2001 disestablishments in Australia